In mathematics, the Lyapunov–Schmidt reduction or Lyapunov–Schmidt construction is used to study solutions to nonlinear equations in the case when the implicit function theorem does not work. It permits the reduction of infinite-dimensional equations in Banach spaces to finite-dimensional equations. It is named after Aleksandr Lyapunov and Erhard Schmidt.

Problem setup
Let

Banach spaces ( is the parameter space).  is the
-map from a neighborhood of some point  to
 and the equation is satisfied at this point

For the case when the linear operator  is invertible, the implicit function theorem assures that there exists

In the opposite case, when the linear operator  is non-invertible, the Lyapunov–Schmidt reduction can be applied in the following
way.

Assumptions

One assumes that the operator   is a Fredholm operator.

 and  has finite dimension.

The range of this operator  has finite co-dimension and

Without loss of generality, one can assume that

Lyapunov–Schmidt construction

Let us split   into the direct product , where  .

Let   be the projection operator onto  .

Consider also the direct product .

(now the conditions of the implicit function theorem are fulfilled).

Thus, there exists a unique solution   satisfying

Now substituting  into the second equation, one obtains the final finite-dimensional equation

Applications 
Lyapunov–Schmidt reduction has been used in economics, natural sciences, and engineering often in combination with bifurcation theory, perturbation theory, and regularization. LS reduction is often used to rigorously regularize partial differential equation models in chemical engineering resulting in models that are easier to simulate numerically but still retain all the parameters of the original model.

References

Bibliography 
 Louis Nirenberg, Topics in nonlinear functional analysis, New York Univ. Lecture Notes, 1974.
 Aleksandr Lyapunov,  Sur les figures d’équilibre peu différents des ellipsoides d’une masse liquide homogène douée d’un mouvement de rotation, Zap. Akad. Nauk St. Petersburg (1906), 1–225.
 Aleksandr Lyapunov, Problème général de la stabilité du mouvement, Ann. Fac. Sci. Toulouse 2 (1907), 203–474.
 Erhard Schmidt, Zur Theory der linearen und nichtlinearen Integralgleichungen, 3 Teil, Math. Annalen 65 (1908), 370–399.

Functional analysis